A trade war is an economic conflict often resulting from extreme protectionism in which states raise or create tariffs or other trade barriers against each other in response to trade barriers created by the other party. If tariffs are the exclusive mechanism, then such conflicts are known as  customs wars, toll wars, or tariff wars; as a reprisal, the latter state may also increase the tariffs. Trade war arises only if the competitive protection between states is of the same type and it is not valid in case of dumping exports (Perju, 2009). Increased protection causes both nations' output compositions to move towards their autarky position. Minor trade disagreements are often called trade disputes when the war metaphor is hyperbolic. 

Trade wars could be escalated to full conflict between states, as evidenced in the Massacre of the Bandanese after alleged violations of a new treaty. The First Anglo-Dutch War caused by disputes over trade, the war began with English attacks on Dutch merchant shipping, but expanded to vast fleet actions. The Second Anglo-Dutch War for control over the seas and trade routes, where England tried to end the Dutch domination of world trade during a period of intense European commercial rivalry. The Fourth Anglo-Dutch War over British and Dutch disagreements on the legality and conduct of Dutch trade with Britain's enemies in that war. The Shimonoseki Campaign after unrest over the shogunate's open-door policy to foreign trade. The First Opium War which started after the Qing government blockaded its ports, confiscated opium contraband and confined British traders, resulted in the dispatch of the British Navy to China and engage the Chinese Navy in the Battle of Kowloon. The First Opium War eventually led to the British colony of Hong Kong, and the Second Opium War, which arose from another trade war with the same underlying causes, expanded the British possessions on the island.

Exploration of an example (1920s)
One example of a modern tariff war occurred in the 1920s and 1930s between the Weimar Republic and Poland, in the German–Polish customs war. The Weimar Republic, led by Gustav Stresemann wanted to force Poland, by creating an economic crisis by increasing the tolls for coal and steel products developed there, to give up its territory. As a reprisal, the Poles increased toll rates for many German products. This led to fast development of the port of Gdynia, which was the only way Poland could export its goods to Western Europe without having to transport them through Germany.

In September 1922, the Fordney–McCumber Tariff (named after Joseph Fordney, chair of the House Ways and Means Committee, and Porter McCumber, chair of the Senate Finance Committee) was signed by U.S. President Warren G. Harding.  In the end, the tariff law raised the average American ad valorem tariff rate to 38 percent.

Trading partners complained immediately.  Those injured by World War I said that, without access by their exports to the American market, they would not be able to make payments to America on war loans.  But others saw that this tariff increase would have broader deleterious effects.  Democratic Representative Cordell Hull said, "Our foreign markets depend both on the efficiency of our production and the tariffs of countries in which we would sell.  Our own [high] tariffs are an important factor in each.  They injure the former and invite the latter."

Five years after the passage of the tariff, American trading partners had raised their own tariffs by a significant degree.  France raised its tariffs on automobiles from 45% to 100%, Spain raised tariffs on American goods by 40%, and Germany and Italy raised tariffs on wheat. This customs war is often cited as one of the main causes of the Great Depression.

Dispute settlement mechanisms

Compromis
Economic integration
European Economic Community, predecessor of the European Union
EU–UK Trade and Cooperation Agreement (post-Brexit)
Free trade agreements
Free-trade areas
List of multilateral free-trade agreements
GATT (General Agreement on Tariffs and Trade) (1947-present; modified by WTO formation in 1994-1995)
World Trade Organization, created in the 1990s to avoid customs wars, which are counterproductive in net effect
History of the World Trade Organization (1990s-present, after decades of efforts to fill the vacuum of the absence of such an institution)
Dispute settlement in the World Trade Organization
Dispute Settlement Body of the WTO 
List of WTO dispute settlement cases
International Centre for Settlement of Investment Disputes
Investor-state dispute settlement
Trade and Investment Framework Agreement
TRIPS Agreement
United Nations Commission on International Trade Law

List of trade wars or trade disputes

Pre-20th century 
Anglo-Dutch Wars (1652–1784)
Opium Wars (1839–1860)

20th century 
Japan–Korea disputes (1876-1945)
Banana Wars (1898–1934)
Smoot–Hawley Tariff Act (1930), a United States Act implementing protectionist trade policies
Anglo-Irish trade war (1932–1938)
Chicken War (1960s), U.S. versus European Economic Community

21st century 
Beef hormone controversy (Beef War) (1989-2008)
Canada–Australia salmon trade dispute (1995-2000)
Japanese Sound Recording Trade Disputes (1996–1997)
Broomcorn brooms dispute (1996-2014)
Brazil–United States cotton dispute (2002-2014)
US Mexico Trade Dispute - Stainless Steel Sheets and Coils dumping (2006-2009)
EC-IT product dispute (2008-2010)
Milk War (2009)
Trade war over genetically modified food (2010–2011)
South Africa–Brazil Frozen Chicken Trade Dispute (2012)
Argentina–United States lemon dispute (2012)
Mexico–United States sugarcane trade dispute (2014)
Rare earths trade dispute (2012-2015)
Trump tariffs (2018 U.S.-Canada trade dispute)
Tuna-Dolphin GATT Case (I and II), part of a larger tuna trade war (1970s-present)
Canada–United States softwood lumber dispute (1982-present)
Catfish Dispute, U.S. versus Vietnam (2001-present)
China–United States trade war (2018–present)
Japan–South Korea trade dispute (2019–present)

See also

Balance of trade
Currency war
Economic sanctions
Economic warfare
Trade barrier
Water conflict

References

Bibliography

Smoot-Hawley Tariff Act. (2005). Encyclopædia Britannica. Retrieved October 15, 2005, from Encyclopædia Britannica Online
Perju, Genoveva Elena, Retaliatory Disagreement Point with Asymmetric Countries: Evidence from European Wine Sector During Enlargement (June 15, 2009). Available at SSRN: https://ssrn.com/abstract=1435993 or http://dx.doi.org/10.2139/ssrn.1435993 

 
Economic warfare
Customs duties
Metaphors referring to war and violence